Channel 39 may refer to several television stations:

Canada
The following television stations broadcast on digital or analog channel 39 (UHF frequencies covering 621.25-625.75 MHz) in Canada:
 CBHT-DT in Halifax, Nova Scotia
 CFAP-DT in Quebec City, Quebec
 CJIL-TV-1 in Bow Island, Alberta

New Zealand
Channel 39 (New Zealand) (also known as Southern Television and formerly Channel 9 and Dunedin Television)

Philippines
 SMNI 39

See also
 Channel 39 TV stations in Mexico
 Channel 39 digital TV stations in the United States
 Channel 39 virtual TV stations in the United States
 Channel 39 low-power TV stations in the United States

39